Warrior Mountain is a ridge located in Allegany County, Maryland. North of this gap, the Warrior Ridge runs parallel and to the east of Tussey Mountain north past Everett, Pennsylvania until its ridge line merges with the Tussey Mountain ridge line at the Blair County/Bedford County boundary.

References

External links 
 
 

Landforms of Allegany County, Maryland
Ridges of Maryland